Harvey Wiley Corbett (January 8, 1873 – April 21, 1954) was an American architect primarily known for skyscraper and office building designs in New York and London, and his advocacy of tall buildings and modernism in architecture.

Early life and career 
Corbett was a San Francisco native. He was an 1895 graduate of the engineering program at the University of California, Berkeley and then was educated at the Ecole des Beaux Arts in Paris, where he was registered as a student on August 18, 1896, by teacher Godefroy-Freynet. After his graduation in 1900, he started work in the firm of Cass Gilbert.

One of Corbett's early commissions during the 1910s was for the landmark Springfield Municipal Group, two large municipal buildings with a tower in Springfield, Massachusetts, in partnership with Francis Livingston Pell (1873-1945), firm of Pell & Corbett.

Middle and later years 

As part of the firm of Helmle & Corbett, Harvey Wiley Corbett designed Bush Tower, a 30-story Neo-Gothic skyscraper built for the Bush Terminal Company on 42nd St. near Times Square, Manhattan. The tower, "with its prominent position and slight setbacks in buff, white and black brick, marked his début as an influential skyscraper designer."

Corbett's next major commission was in London, where again working for Irving T. Bush and the Bush Terminal Co., he was the architect for Bush House, a massive and essentially American-style office building built within the limits of strict London building codes.

Later in the 1920s, Harvey Wiley Corbett was part of one of the three firms that designed Rockefeller Center in New York.  Corbett, however, left the Rockefeller Center project in 1928, so he could work on plans for the Metropolitan Life North Building, designed as a 100-story skyscraper and the world's tallest building, but eventually built as a 32-story tower during the Great Depression.

Corbett, continued to design some structures during the Great Depression, notably the massive New York City Criminal Courts Building in downtown Manhattan, the northern tower of which is the Manhattan Detention Center (The Tombs). The complex was designed with Charles B. Meyers and completed in 1941.

Views and writings 
According to his obituary in The New York Times, Corbett was a longtime and ardent champion of skyscrapers and modernism.

In 1922, Corbett commissioned delineator and architect Hugh Ferriss to draw a series of four step-by-step perspectives demonstrating the architectural consequences of New York's "setback" zoning law. These four drawings would later be used in Ferriss's 1929 book The Metropolis of Tomorrow. By demonstrating how architecture might evolve, Corbett's commission and Ferriss's book continue to influence popular culture; the Gotham City of Batman and the cities seen in the 2004 movie Sky Captain and the World of Tomorrow both were influenced by Corbett and Ferriss.

In the late 1920s, the impact of skyscrapers on cities and downtowns was still hotly debated. Harvey Corbett defended the benefits of tall buildings against skyscraper detractors in articles published in The New York Times Magazine and the National Municipal Journal in 1927.

In 1930, Corbett described modernism in architecture as a "freeing of the shackles of style that for years have forced architects to erect duplicates of Grecian temples for bank buildings, regardless of modern requirements for light, air, and utility."

H.W. Corbett lectured at the Columbia School of Architecture at Columbia University in New York from 1907 to the 1930s, further influencing a generation of architects.

Legacy 
 In addition to his work on skyscrapers, office buildings, and municipal buildings, Harvey Wiley Corbett designed monuments such as the Peace Arch (1921) on the Canada–US border and the George Washington Masonic National Memorial in Virginia (cornerstone laid in 1923).

Later, Corbett shaped the course of architecture by heading the architectural committee of the 1933 World's Fair (the "Century of Progress" exhibition) in Chicago. He was also chairman of the advisory committee of architects that created the theme for the modernistic 1939 New York World's Fair. Both fairs were influential examples of modern architecture.

Because of his work in America and England, Harvey Corbett was simultaneously a fellow of the American Institute of Architects and the Royal Institute of British Architects. One month before his death, the New York Chapter of the American Institute of Architects granted him their annual award for career achievement. In 1926, he was elected into the National Academy of Design as an Associate Academician, and became a full Academician in 1930.

Today, Corbett's papers are contained within the collection of the Avery Architectural and Fine Arts Library at Columbia University.

Selected works 

 New York School of Applied Design for Women (1909)
 Bush Tower (1918)
 Peace Arch (1921)
 Navy – Merchant Marine Memorial (1922)
 Bush House, London (1923)
 One Fifth Avenue (1927)
 PPL Building (1928) at 28 stories, the tallest building in Allentown, Pennsylvania
 Master Apartments (1929)
 Metropolitan Life North Building (begun 1928, completed 1950; with D. Everett Waid)
 George Washington Masonic National Memorial (1922–1932)
 New York City Criminal Courts Building (including The Tombs; with Charles B. Meyers) (1941)
 Springfield Municipal Group in Springfield, Massachusetts

References

External links 
 Corbett, Harvey Wiley on artnet.com, derived from the Grove Dictionary of Art
 Harvey Wiley Corbett architectural drawings and papers, circa 1914–1949. Held by the Department of Drawings & Archives, Avery Architectural & Fine Arts Library, Columbia University.

Further reading 
 Stoller, Paul D. (1995). The Architecture of Harvey Wiley Corbett Madison: University of Wisconsin-Madison Libraries
 Willis, Carol (1982). "Corbett, Harvey Wiley." Macmillan Encyclopedia of Architects, ed. Adolf K. Placzek. New York: The Free Press, pp. 451–452

1873 births
1954 deaths
20th-century American architects
Architects from San Francisco
UC Berkeley College of Engineering alumni
National Sculpture Society members